Mshengu may refer to:

 Joseph Shabalala, the lead singer, founder and musical director of Ladysmith Black Mambazo
 Mshengu White Mambazo, a South African singing group spawned from Ladysmith Black Mambazo